Jeremiah Driver (16 May 1861 – 10 December 1946) was an English first-class cricketer, who played two matches for Yorkshire County Cricket Club in 1889, against Gloucestershire and Lancashire.  A wicket-keeper, he took two catches and scored 24 runs at an average of 8.00.

Born in Keighley, Yorkshire, he died in his home town in December 1946.

References

External links
Cricinfo Profile

1861 births
1946 deaths
Yorkshire cricketers
Cricketers from Keighley
English cricketers
English cricketers of 1864 to 1889